Financial globalization may refer to:

 Economic globalization (particularly its financial aspects)
 Global financial system